"'Instead" is the opening track of Madeleine Peyroux's album Bare Bones. It was a retro-feeling and charted on the Japanese 100 Singles.
According to Peyroux, the song is a reminder of how we should enjoy life and the things we have. Reportedly, she wrote it in a "dark point" of her life.
To promote the song, it was released as a video of a live performance.

References

2009 singles
Songs written by Madeleine Peyroux
2008 songs
Rounder Records singles